Andrey Hungovich Nguyen (born 10 December 1998) is a Russian-born Vietnamese professional footballer who plays as a midfielder for Hải Phòng.

Career

In 2019, Nguyễn signed for Vietnamese side Hải Phòng.

References

External links
 

Living people
1998 births
People from Elista
Sportspeople of Vietnamese descent
Russian people of Vietnamese descent
Association football midfielders
Russian footballers
V.League 1 players
Russian expatriate footballers
Russian expatriate sportspeople in Vietnam
Expatriate footballers in Vietnam
Sportspeople from Kalmykia